Qanibeyglu Rural District is in Zanjanrud District of Zanjan County, Zanjan province, Iran. At the National Census of 2006, its population was 9,629 in 2,326 households. There were 8,413 inhabitants in 2,358 households at the following census of 2011. At the most recent census of 2016, the population of the rural district was 6,674 in 2,057 households. The largest of its 34 villages was Mirjan, with 1,270 people.

References 

Zanjan County

Rural Districts of Zanjan Province

Populated places in Zanjan Province

Populated places in Zanjan County